Khiamniungan is a Sino-Tibetan language spoken by the Khiamniungan people in east-central Noklak District of Nagaland in northeastern India and in northwestern Burma. Most of the Khiamniungans in India are known to Pathso-Nyu which remains the main language within their geographical region.

Names
Alternate names for Khiamniungan include Aoshedd, Khiamnga, Kalyokengnyu, Khiamngan, Khiamniungan, Nokaw, Tukhemmi, and Welam (Ethnologue).

Distribution and status
There are approximately 50,000 speakers of Khiamniungan. There are an estimated 29 Khiamniungan villages in India and 132 in Burma. "Khiamniungan" is the autonym for the language, which means "the source of water" or "water people", whereas Kalyokengnyu is an exonym meaning "dwelling in stone", given to the group by European anthropologists after the slate roof houses the people lived in. The low number of speakers of Khiamniugan makes it vulnerable, but it is taught in schools and supported by the government through cultural programs.

Writing system
Like most languages spoken in Nagaland, Khiamniungan is written in a Latin alphabet, due to the early Christian missionary presence in the region.

History of scholarship
Most of the information of Khiamniungan comes from its inclusion in studies of the Naga or Konyak languages by the Central Institute for Indian Languages in Mysore. There is also a Khiamniungan vocabulary published in 1974 by Nagaland Bhasha-Parishad.

See also
Khiamniungan people

References

External links
 Khiamniungan Naga at the Endangered Languages Project

Languages of Myanmar
Languages of Nagaland
Sal languages
Endangered languages of India
Endangered Sino-Tibetan languages